In 1938–39, Everton won their fifth English title (and the last English top-flight title before World War II as the subsequent season was abandoned when Britain declared war on Germany on 3 September 1939). The club also competed in the FA Cup, advancing to the 6th round where they lost away to Wolves.

League table

Competitions

First Division

FA Cup

Squad

References

Everton F.C. seasons
English football clubs 1938–39 season
English football championship-winning seasons